SM U-6 was one of the 329 submarines serving in the Imperial German Navy in World War I. 
U-6 was engaged in naval warfare and took part in the First Battle of the Atlantic.

War Service
On 25 February 1915 U-6 left Germany for operations in the English Channel. She reached Cap Gris Nez on 27 February, and on 28 February was preparing to carry out an attack on the British steamer Thordis off Beachy Head, when the submarine's periscope was spotted by the merchant ship, which rammed U-6, damaging U-6s periscope. This forced the submarine to abandon her patrol and return to base.

U-6 operated in the North Sea between 7 and 20 April 1915. Based in Heligoland, she left for the British east coast. On 11 April she launched two torpedo attacks against a steamer off Aberdeen; both attacks failed. For the next three days U-6 observed shipping in the area until she successfully attacked and sank two steamers on 14 April. On 18 April she took the British trawler Glencarse (188 tons) as a prize and headed back to base, arriving in Heligoland on 21 April 1915.

Leaving Heligoland again on 17 July 1915, U-6 sank a Swedish sailing ship of 422 tons carrying timber to Britain on 19 July. On 21 July she took two Swedish steamers as prizes and set two more sailing ships (757 tons) carrying timber to Britain on fire. Three Norwegian sailing ships were burnt on 25 July. After a brief brush with a Q ship the next day, a Swedish steamer and three Danish sailing ships were burned. When she ran low on fuel, U-6 returned to base on 29 July reaching Heligoland the next day.

On 9 September 1915 U-6 sailed for what would be her final cruise. Burning two Norwegian sailing ships carrying timber to Britain on 10 September, U-6 took a Norwegian steamer as prize. Two days later a Norwegian motor vessel was searched and sunk off Kristiansand.

Fate
In the afternoon on 15 September 1915, U-6 was attacked by a British submarine with two torpedoes. Evasive manoeuvres were only partly successful. While the first torpedo missed, the second struck U-6 right in front of the conning tower, sinking her instantly. Except for five men on  the conning tower all of U-6s crew perished. According to Oberleutnant z.S. Beyer, officer of the watch at the time of her sinking, the smoke from U-6s paraffin engines made the commander of the Royal Navy submarine aware of her presence and enabled him to get into launching position.

Summary of raiding history

References

Bibliography

Spindler, Handelskrieg, Vol.II, pp. 75, 133-4, 246-7

World War I submarines of Germany
Type U 5 submarines
1910 ships
Ships built in Kiel
U-boats commissioned in 1910
Maritime incidents in 1915
U-boats sunk in 1915
U-boats sunk by British submarines
World War I shipwrecks in the North Sea